Yandex Data Factory (YDF) is a B2B division of Yandex, the leading Russian search engine and one of the largest European internet companies. YDF uses artificial intelligence and machine learning technologies to increase productivity, reduce costs, and improve energy efficiency in process manufacturing. Among their clients and partners are Intel, AstraZeneca, CERN, Magnitogorsk Iron and Steel Works, Gazprom Neft, and Schlumberger.

References

Official website

Business-to-business
Yandex